Oscarine Masuluke (born 23 April 1993) is a South African professional footballer who plays as a goalkeeper for Baroka FC. He previously played for TS Sporting.

On 30 November 2016, Masuluke gained attention after his last-minute chilena kick goal earned Baroka a 1–1 draw with the Orlando Pirates. The goal was later nominated for the 2017 FIFA Puskás Award. Masuluke finished second in the voting, with Olivier Giroud elected the winner and Deyna Castellanos taking third. On 27 February 2018, he was released by Baroka following allegations that he and other teammates drank on the team bus.

He joined National First Division side TS Sporting in summer 2018. He made 33 league appearances for them before leaving in 2018.

He returned to Baroka on a three-year deal in September 2020.

References

External links

1993 births
Living people
South African soccer players
Baroka F.C. players
South African Premier Division players
Association football goalkeepers
TS Sporting F.C. players
National First Division players